Mauricio  Quintanilla Villalobos (born 8 October 1952 in San Salvador, El Salvador) is a retired Salvadoran football (soccer) player.

Club career
Nicknamed el Chino, Quintanilla started his career at Salvadoran second division side Atlante and joined UES, aged 19. He also played for Guatemalan outfit Xelajú and Salvadoran giants Águila.

International career
Quintanilla represented El Salvador in 2 FIFA World Cup qualification matches  and earned 5 caps. He just missed out on the 1982 FIFA World Cup.

References

1952 births
Living people
Sportspeople from San Salvador
Association football forwards
Salvadoran footballers
El Salvador international footballers
Xelajú MC players
C.D. Águila footballers
Salvadoran expatriate footballers
Expatriate footballers in Guatemala